Hanna Stanisława Suchocka (born 3 April 1946) is a Polish political figure, lawyer, professor at Adam Mickiewicz University in Poznań and Chair of the Constitutional Law Department, former First Vice-President and Honorary President of the Venice Commission.

She served as the Prime Minister of Poland between 8 July 1992 and 26 October 1993 under the presidency of Lech Wałęsa. She is the first woman to hold this post in Poland (preceding Ewa Kopacz and Beata Szydło who both held the post in the 2010s) and was the 14th woman to be appointed and serve as Prime Minister in the world.

Early life
Suchocka was born in Pleszew, Poland, in a Catholic family of chemists. Her grandfather was a University teacher and her grandmother Anna became a member of the first Polish parliament for Poznań after independence in 1918 when women got the right to vote. Suchocka went to law school and became a researcher at the University of Poznan but she was fired when she refused to join the Communist party. She was preoccupied with human rights and undertook a PhD in Constitutional Law in West Germany in 1975.

Political career

In 1969, she joined a small non-Marxist 'satellite party', the Democratic Party (SD), and was a member of parliament the Sejm of People's Republic of Poland in 1980–1985. At the same time, she was a member and a legal advisor to Solidarity. She was one of only a few MPs who did not to vote in favour of martial law in 1981 and the criminalisation of Solidarity in 1984. The party suspended her (or she resigned), but with the support of Solidarity, she was re-elected to parliament in 1989. When Solidarity supporters split up into several political parties, Suchocka joined the centre-liberal Democratic Union (DU) and was re-elected to parliament in 1991.

Prime Minister of Poland (1992-1993)

She became Prime Minister in 1992. Governments at the time were based on various coalitions and changed constantly. Suchocka was chosen to the amazement of many male politicians but she was known for her low profile and willingness to make compromises and promote reconciliation. She could be accepted by people who had an antipathy towards more prominent leaders of DU. In addition, as a left-winger, while being opposed to abortion as a Catholic, she could be accepted by both sides of the political spectrum and satisfy the interests of a majority in a parliament consisting of seven parties, including a Christian and a liberal party.

Hanna Suchocka declared that her government was for social reconciliation and would lead the country forward in the transformation from communism to capitalism. She was approved by 233 against 61 votes and 113 abstentions She quickly formed a cabinet, but it didn't include any other female ministers, although she wanted them. None of the coalition partners was willing to accept another woman and she got two male deputy prime ministers. She stayed longer as prime minister than any of her four predecessors, but she did not stay long. There was a wave of strikes and Suchocka was a warm supporter of market reforms and followed a hard line against the strikers. When she wouldn't give salary increases to teachers and health workers, parliament passed a vote of no-confidence by a majority of one vote. Wałęsa dissolved parliament and held new elections. Before the early 1993 parliamentary elections, Suchocka's government signed a concordat with the Holy See, which was the object of charges of the successful Democratic Left Alliance, which criticized the fact that the concordat had signed a cabinet without a parliamentary mandate. Suchocka resigned as soon as the new parliament was in place.

Later career

In 1994, Hanna Suchocka was one of the founders of a liberal and social-democratic Liberty Union party, which became the country's third-largest political force. From 1997 to 2000 she was the minister of justice in a coalition government. Suchocka's candidacy stirred controversy amongst some of the activists who co-founded the Solidarity Electoral Action (AWS) and Centre Agreement (PC). In August 1997, former Interior Minister Zbigniew Siemiątkowski accused Suchocka's government of allowing alleged surveillance of opposition political parties. On 8 June 2000, the entire Freedom Union (UW) left the coalition after weeks of negotiations failed to find an acceptable replacement for Jerzy Buzek (whom the Freedom Union accused of failing to push through economic reforms).

She is also a member of the Club of Madrid.

Hanna Suchocka is a member of the Council of Women World Leaders, an international network of current and former women presidents and prime ministers whose mission is to mobilize the highest-level women leaders globally for collective action on issues of critical importance to women and equitable development.

She served as Poland's Ambassador to the Holy See from 2002 to 2013. She was also a member of the Pontifical Academy of Social Sciences in the Vatican (appointed by Pope John Paul II on 19 January 1994).

In April 2014 Suchocka was among the 8 initial appointees of Pope Francis to the Pontifical Commission for the Protection of Minors.

External links
 Suchocka's page at the Pontifical Academy of Social Sciences

References 

|-

|-

|-

1946 births
20th-century Polish women politicians
21st-century Polish women politicians
Alliance of Democrats (Poland) politicians
Ambassadors of Poland to the Holy See
Democratic Union (Poland) politicians
Female heads of government in Poland
Freedom Union (Poland) politicians
Justice ministers of Poland
Living people
Members of the Polish Sejm 1980–1985
Members of the Polish Sejm 1991–1993
Members of the Polish Sejm 1993–1997
Members of the Polish Sejm 1997–2001
Members of the Pontifical Academy of Social Sciences
Members of the Pontifical Commission for the Protection of Minors
People from Pleszew
Polish Roman Catholics
Prime Ministers of Poland
Women government ministers of Poland
Women members of the Sejm of the Polish People's Republic
Women members of the Sejm of the Republic of Poland
Women prime ministers
Female justice ministers
Polish women ambassadors